Archyala is a genus of moths belonging to the family Tineidae. This genus is endemic to New Zealand. Archyala was first described by Edward Meyrick in 1889.

Species
Archyala culta Philpott, 1931
Archyala lindsayi (Philpott, 1927)
Archyala opulenta Philpott, 1926
Archyala pagetodes (Meyrick, 1911)
Archyala paraglypta Meyrick, 1889
Archyala pentazyga Meyrick, 1915
Archyala terranea (Butler, 1879)
Archyala tigrina Philpott, 1930

References

Tineidae
Moths of New Zealand
Endemic fauna of New Zealand
Tineidae genera
Taxa named by Edward Meyrick
Endemic moths of New Zealand